Mariano Armand del Rosario (born 8 December 1978), is an American-Filipino footballer who plays as a defender for Loyola in the United Football League.

Del Rosario is the elder brother of former Philippine international footballer Anton del Rosario.

Personal life
Armand is married to Georgia Schulze-Del Rosario and they have four daughters together.

In 2012, Del Rosario competed with his brother Anton on the first season of The Amazing Race Philippines. They were eliminated in Leg 2 after they violated a show rule by making a phone call to their mother and finished in 10th place.

Honors

Club
Kaya
United Football League: Runner-up 2011–12

Loyola
UFL Cup: Third place 2013

References

1978 births
Living people
Kaya F.C. players
Soccer players from San Francisco
Citizens of the Philippines through descent
American soccer players
Filipino footballers
F.C. Meralco Manila players
American sportspeople of Filipino descent
Philippines international footballers
Association football defenders
The Amazing Race contestants